Not Just the Girl Next Door is the second studio album by Canadian singer Nancy Martinez, released in 1986 by Atlantic Records.

The album's lead single, "For Tonight", reached number 32 on the US Billboard Hot 100 and number two on the Dance Club Songs chart. The follow-up single, "Move Out", reached number 12 on the Dance Club Play chart.

Track listing

Chart performance

Album

Singles

References

Nancy Martinez albums
1986 albums
Atlantic Records albums